Krein is a surname. Notable people with the surname include:

Alexander Krein (1883–1951), Soviet composer
Howard Krein, American plastic surgeon and business executive
Mark Krein (1907–1989), Ukrainian-Soviet mathematician

Russian-language surnames